The Elmira College Old Campus is the historic part of Elmira College in Elmira, New York. Historically known as The Elmira Collegiate Seminary or The Elmira Female College, the college was the first in the United States to offer to women a degree program on a par with programs offered to men. The contributing structures are significant examples of the architecture of the period. The contributing buildings are Cowles Hall, Hamilton House, Mark Twain's Study, Gillett Hall, Carnegie Science Hall, Fassett Commons, Tompkins Hall, and Hamilton Hall.

Gallery

References

External links

Historic districts on the National Register of Historic Places in New York (state)
Historic American Buildings Survey in New York (state)
Gothic Revival architecture in New York (state)
School buildings on the National Register of Historic Places in New York (state)
Buildings and structures in Elmira, New York
National Register of Historic Places in Chemung County, New York
History of women in New York (state)